Ebony is an English feminine given name often given in reference to the color black or to the ornamental wood. It has been particularly well used by Blacks in the United States. It was among the one thousand most popular names for American girls between 1971 and 2005, but has since declined in usage. Spelling variants include Ebonee and Eboni.<ref> https://www.behindthename.com/name/ebony</</ref>

People
Ebony Alleyne, English R&B and soul singer
L. Ebony Boulware, American general internist, physician-scientist, and clinical epidemiologist
Ebony Collins (born 1989), American sprinter
Ebony Day (born 1993), English singer, songwriter, and YouTube personality
Ebony Flowers, American prose writer and cartoonist
Ebony Hoffman (born 1982), former professional basketball player and a current assistant coach for the Seattle Storm
Ebony Hoskin (born 2003), Australian cricketer who currently plays for New South Wales Breakers in the Australian Women's National Cricket League
Ebony Naomi Oshunrinde (born 1996), Canadian record producer, songwriter and record executive known professionally as WondaGurl
Ebony Obsidian (born 1994), American actress
Ebony Patterson (born 1981), Jamaican-born visual artist and educator based in the United States
Ebony Rainford-Brent (born 1983), English former cricketer who is now a commentator and Director of Women's Cricket at Surrey
Ebony Rolph (born 1994), Australian professional basketball player
Ebony Salmon (born 2001), English professional footballer
Ebony Satala (born 1989), Fijian rugby union player
Ebony M. Scott (born 1974), American lawyer who serves as an Associate Judge of the Superior Court of the District of Columbia

See also
Eboni
Iben (given name)

Notes

English feminine given names
Given names derived from plants or flowers